Hancı is a Turkish-language occupational surname literally meaning "innkeeper" ("han keeper"), Notable people with the surname include:
 (1923-2007), Turkish architect
Doğan Hancı (born 1970), Turkish para-archer
 (born 1955), Turkish actress
 (born 2001), Turkish track and field athlete specializing in the javelin throw

Turkish-language surnames